Andarpa (also Romanized as Andarpā) is a village in Khorram Dasht Rural District, Kamareh District, Khomeyn County, Markazi Province, Iran. At the 2006 census, its population was 144, spread over 48 families.

References 

Populated places in Khomeyn County